The 2020–21 Wagner Seahawks men's basketball team represented Wagner College during the 2020–21 NCAA Division I men's basketball season. The Seahawks are led by ninth-year head coach Bashir Mason. They play their home games at Spiro Sports Center on the school's Staten Island campus as members of the Northeast Conference.

Previous season
The Seahawks finished the 2019–20 season 8–21, 5–13 in NEC play to finish in tenth place. They failed to qualify for the NEC tournament.

Roster

Schedule and results

|-
!colspan=12 style=| Regular season

 

|-
!colspan=12 style=| NEC tournament
|-

|-

Source

References

Wagner Seahawks men's basketball seasons
Wagner Seahawks
Wagner Seahawks men's basketball team
Wagner Seahawks men's basketball team